Iran's ethnic diversity means that the languages of Iran come from a number of linguistic origins, although the primary language spoken and used is Persian. The Constitution of the Islamic Republic of Iran asserts that the Persian language alone must be used for schooling and for all official government communications. The constitution also recognizes Arabic as the language of Islam, and assigns it formal status as the language of religion. Although multilingualism is not encouraged, the use of minority languages is permitted in the course of teaching minority-language literature. Different publications have reported different statistics for the languages of Iran; however, the top three languages spoken are consistently reported as Persian, Azeri and Kurdish.

Language policy and planning of Iran 
The current language policy of Iran is addressed in Chapter Two of the Constitution of the Islamic Republic of Iran (Articles 15 & 16). It asserts that the Persian language is the lingua franca of the Iranian nation and as such, required for the school system and for all official government communications. In addition, the constitution recognizes the Arabic language as the language of Islam, giving it formal status as the language of religion and regulating its spread within the Iranian national curriculum.

Due to the nation's social and ethnic diversity, the constitution also acknowledges and permits the use of minority languages in the mass media as well as within the schools, in order to teach minority-language literature. The minority languages of Iran do not receive formal status and are not officially regulated by the authorities.

The first legislation which granted the Persian language its status was initiated by Qajar dynasty in 1906, as part of an electoral law that positioned it as the official language of the state of Iran, its government, its political institutions and its legal system. Over time, this enactment was followed by others, which eventually led to a monolingual policy by the Iranian regime.

Perceiving multilingualism as a threat to the nation's unity and territorial integrity, and seeing the need to restrict minority languages’ use and to advance the Persian language's hegemony, Iran's language policy consists of a non-translation outline as well: all government, administration and educational settings are obliged to use only Persian for any written communication. This applies to political institutions (i.e. the Iranian Parliament), official bureaucratic communication (forms, signage etc.) and schooling (all children from the age of six are exposed only to Persian as the language of teaching and learning and of textbooks within the public school system). In other words, the Iranian authorities hold that minorities need to learn the Iranian vernacular to an extent that will allow them to communicate with state institutions.

Among the institutions accountable for advancing Iranian Language Planning (e.g. Ministry of Education and Ministry of Science, Research and Technology) is the Academy of Persian Language and Literature, which was established on 1935, under Reza Shah Pahlavi. Constantly seeking to revise and elaborate the nation's official language, this institute focuses on the linguistics of the Persian language and on the internal aspects of Language Planning, rather than on the use of minority languages within Iranian society. Other Language Planning aspects (e.g. sociolinguistic or functional literacy) have not been assigned to a formal institute and are currently handled free of any official master plan by the educational ministries.

Languages of Iran 
Different publications have reported different statistics for the languages of Iran. There have been some limited censuses taken in Iran in 2001, 1991, 1986 and 1949–1954.
The following are the languages with the greatest number of speakers (data from the CIA World Factbook):

Classification categories of the spoken languages:
 Indo-European (Iranic mainly, smaller amounts of other branches represented mainly by Armenian, amongst others)
 Turkic (mainly Azerbaijani, with smaller amounts of Turkmen, Qashqai, and Afshar)
 Semitic (mainly Arabic, but also Neo-Aramaic, Hebrew, and Mandean)
 Caucasian languages (such as Kartvelian and Circassian)

Census in the 1990s
A census was taken in the Iranian month of Mordad (July 21 – August 21) in 1991. In this census, all 49,588 mothers who gave birth in the country were issued birth certificates and asked about their mother-tongue. They reported: 46.2% (Persian), 20.6% (Azerbaijani), 10% Kurdish, 8.9% Luri, 7.2% Gilaki and Mazandarani, 3.5% Arabic, 2.7% Baluchi, 0.6% Turkmen, 0.1% Armenian, and 0.2% Others (e.g. Circassian, Georgian, etc.). The local dialect of Arabic spoken in Iran is Khuzestani Arabic, but the varieties of Arabic taught across Iran to students in secondary schools, regardless of their ethnic or linguistic background, are Modern Standard Arabic and Classical Arabic, the latter a liturgical language of Islam.

Other estimations
In 1986, a nationwide census was undertaken to determine the percentage of Iranians that know Persian, those who do not know, and those who know it fluently.

See also
Demographics of Iran
Ethnicities in Iran
Iranian languages
Peoples of the Caucasus in Iran

References

External links
Ethnologue report for languages of Iran
CIA FactBook
Languages of Iran. Atlas